Ryan Jamari Spann (born August 24, 1991) is an American mixed martial artist. He currently competes in the Light Heavyweight division in the Ultimate Fighting Championship (UFC). A professional since 2013, he has also fought for the Legacy Fighting Alliance, where he was the Light Heavyweight Champion. As of March 13, 2023, he is #10 in the UFC light heavyweight rankings.

Background
Spann grew up in Westwood, Memphis, Tennessee and began training martial arts in his early childhood.

Mixed martial arts career

Early career 
After compiling a 3–1 amateur record as a Middleweight and Welterweight, Spann started his professional career in 2013. He fought under various promotions, notably the regional
Legacy Fighting Championship and Legacy Fighting Alliance where he was the Light Heavyweight Champion. He amassed a record of 13-5 prior participated in Dana White's Contender Series.

Dana White's Contender Series 

Spann appeared in Dana White's Contender Series 3 on July 25, 2017 against Karl Roberson. He lost the fight by knockout due to elbows in round one.

Spann's second appearance in Dana White's Contender Series 10 came on June 19, 2018 against Emiliano Sordi. He won the fight via guillotine choke in round one and he was awarded a UFC contract.

Ultimate Fighting Championship
Spann made his UFC debut on September 22, 2018 at UFC Fight Night: Santos vs. Anders, facing Luis Henrique, replacing an injured Mark Godbeer. He won the fight via unanimous decision.

Spann's second UFC fight came  on 11 May 2019, 2019 at UFC 237 against Antônio Rogério Nogueira. He won the fight via knockout in the first round.

Spann faced Devin Clark on October 12, 2019, at UFC Fight Night: Joanna vs. Waterson. He won the fight via submission in round two.

Spann was briefly linked to face Ovince Saint Preux on February 8, 2020 at UFC 247. However, promotion matchmakers elected to go in another direction and the pairing was scrapped from the event. Instead, Spann was booked against Paul Craig on March 21, 2020 at UFC Fight Night: Woodley vs. Edwards. However, the event was cancelled.

Spann faced Sam Alvey May 9, 2020 at UFC 249. Despite getting knocked down in the third round, Spann won the fight via split decision.

Spann was initially scheduled to face Johnny Walker at UFC Fight Night 176 on September 5, 2020. However, Walker tested positive for COVID-19 and the bout was postponed to September 19, 2020 at UFC Fight Night 178. Despite dropping Walker twice in the first round, Spann would go onto lose the fight via knockout.

Spann was expected to face Misha Cirkunov on December 19, 2020 at UFC Fight Night 183. However, Cirkunov pulled out in early December due to an injury. The fight was rescheduled to March 13, 2021 at UFC Fight Night 187. After initially knocking Cirkunov down during the first minute, Spann won the fight via technical knockout in round one. This win earned him the Performance of the Night award.

Spann faced Anthony Smith on September 18, 2021 at UFC Fight Night 192. He lost the fight via rear-naked choke submission in round one.

Spann was scheduled to face Ion Cuțelaba on February 26, 2022 at UFC Fight Night 202. However, Spann was pulled from the event due to injury and the bout was rescheduled for UFC on ESPN 36. He won the bout via guillotine choke in the first round.  The win earned Spann his second Performance of the Night bonus award.

Spann faced Dominick Reyes on November 12, 2022 at UFC 281. At the weigh-ins, Spann weighed in at 206.6 pounds, six tenths of a pound over the light heavyweight non-title fight limit. The bout proceeded at a catchweight with Spann fined 20% of his purse, which went to his opponent Reyes. He won the fight via knockout in the first round.

Spann was scheduled to face Nikita Krylov on February 25, 2023, at UFC Fight Night 220. However, the day of the event, Krylov fell ill to a food-borne illness and the main event was cancelled  and the pair was rescheduled to meet at UFC Fight Night: Yan vs. Dvalishvili two weeks later. He lost the fight via a triangle choke submission in the first round.

Championships and accomplishments

Mixed martial arts
Ultimate Fighting Championship
Performance of the Night (Two times) 
Legacy Fighting Alliance
LFA Light Heavyweight Championship (One time) .
Hero FC
Hero FC Middleweight Championship (One time; former)

Mixed martial arts record

|-
|Loss
|align=center|21–8
|Nikita Krylov
|Submission (triangle choke)
|UFC Fight Night: Yan vs. Dvalishvili
|
|align=center|1
|align=center|3:38
|Las Vegas, Nevada, United States
|
|-
|Win
|align=center|21–7
|Dominick Reyes
|KO (punches)
|UFC 281
|
|align=center|1
|align=center|1:20
|New York City, New York, United States
|
|-
|Win
|align=center|20–7
|Ion Cuțelaba 
|Submission (guillotine choke)
|UFC on ESPN: Błachowicz vs. Rakić 
| 
|align=center|1
|align=center|2:22
|Las Vegas, Nevada, United States
|
|-
|Loss
|align=center|19–7
|Anthony Smith
|Submission (rear-naked choke)
|UFC Fight Night: Smith vs. Spann
|
|align=center|1
|align=center|3:47
|Las Vegas, Nevada, United States
|
|-
|Win
|align=center|19–6
|Misha Cirkunov
|TKO (punches)
|UFC Fight Night: Edwards vs. Muhammad
|
|align=center|1
|align=center|1:11
|Las Vegas, Nevada, United States
|
|-
|Loss
|align=center|18–6
|Johnny Walker
|KO (elbows and punches)
|UFC Fight Night: Covington vs. Woodley
|
|align=center|1
|align=center|2:43
|Las Vegas, Nevada, United States
|
|-
|Win
|align=center|18–5
|Sam Alvey
|Decision (split)
|UFC 249
|
|align=center|3
|align=center|5:00
|Jacksonville, Florida, United States
|
|-
|Win
|align=center|17–5 
|Devin Clark
|Submission (guillotine choke)
|UFC Fight Night: Joanna vs. Waterson
|
|align=center|2
|align=center|2:01
|Tampa, Florida, United States
|
|-
|Win
|align=center|16–5
|Antônio Rogério Nogueira
|KO (punches)
|UFC 237
|
|align=center|1
|align=center|2:07
|Rio de Janeiro, Brazil
|
|-
|Win
|align=center|15–5
|Luis Henrique
|Decision (unanimous)
|UFC Fight Night: Santos vs. Anders
|
|align=center|3
|align=center|5:00
|São Paulo, Brazil
|
|-
|Win
|align=center|14–5
|Emiliano Sordi
|Submission (guillotine choke)
|Dana White's Contender Series 10
|
|align=center|1
|align=center|0:26
|Las Vegas, Nevada, United States
|
|-
|Win
|align=center|13–5
|Alex Nicholson
|KO (punches)
|LFA 32
|
|align=center|1
|align=center|4:24
|Lake Charles, Louisiana, United States
|
|-
|Win
|align=center|12–5
|Myron Dennis
|KO (punches)
|LFA 27
|
|align=center|1
|align=center|3:08
|Shawnee, Oklahoma, United States
|
|-
|Win
|align=center|11–5
|LeMarcus Tucker
|Submission (rear-naked choke)
|LFA 23
|
|align=center|1
|align=center|2:55
|Bossier City, Louisiana, United States
|
|-
|Loss
|align=center|10–5
|Karl Roberson
|KO (elbows)
|Dana White's Contender Series 3
|
|align=center|1
|align=center|0:15
|Las Vegas, Nevada, United States
|
|-
|Win
|align=center|10–4
|Roman Pizzolato
|Submission (guillotine choke)
|World Fighting Championships 72
|
|align=center|1
|align=center|0:20
|Baton Rouge, Louisiana, United States
|
|-
|Loss
|align=center|9–4
|Trevin Giles
|Decision (split)
|LFA 3
|
|align=center|3
|align=center|5:00
|Lake Charles, Louisiana, United States
|
|-
|Loss
|align=center|9–3
|Robert Drysdale
|Submission (rear-naked choke)
|Legacy FC 58
|
|align=center|2
|align=center|2:58
|Lake Charles, Louisiana, United States
|
|-
|Win
|align=center|9–2
|Aaron Davis
|Submission (guillotine choke)
|Legacy FC 52
|
|align=center|1
|align=center|2:53
|Lake Charles, Louisiana, United States
|
|-
|Loss
|align=center|8–2
|Leo Leite
|Decision (unanimous)
|Legacy FC 48
|
|align=center|5
|align=center|5:00
|Lake Charles, Louisiana, United States
|
|-
|Win
|align=center|8–1
|Larry Crowe
|KO (punches)
|Legacy FC 42
|
|align=center|1
|align=center|0:08
|Lake Charles, Louisiana, United States
|
|-
|Win
|align=center|7–1
|Dwight Gipson
|Submission (guillotine choke)
|Vengeance Fighting Alliance: Round 5
|
|align=center|1
|align=center|4:39
|Lake Charles, Louisiana, United States
|
|-
|Win
|align=center|6–1
|Artenas Young
|Submission (guillotine choke)
|Fury Fighting 4
|
|align=center|3
|align=center|2:32
|Humble, Texas, United States
|
|-
|Loss
|align=center|5–1
|Brandon Farran
|TKO (punches)
|Hero FC: Best of the Best 3
|
|align=center|1
|align=center|0:21
|Brownsville, Texas, United States
|
|-
|Win
|align=center|5–0
|Randy McCarty
|Decision (unanimous)
|Hero FC 1: Best of the Best
|
|align=center|3
|align=center|5:00
|Harlingen, Texas, United States
|
|-
|Win
|align=center|4–0
|Jhonoven Pati
|Submission (guillotine choke)
|Hero FC: Texas Pride
|
|align=center|1
|align=center|2:32
|Beaumont, Texas, United States
|
|-
|Win
|align=center|3–0
|Brandon Atkins
|Submission (guillotine choke)
|Hero FC: Pride of the Valley 2
|
|align=center|1
|align=center|0:44
|Pharr, Texas, United States
|
|-
|Win
|align=center|2–0
|Steven Zamora
|Submission (rear-naked choke)
|El Orgullo del Valle
|
|align=center|1
|align=center|2:25
|Pharr, Texas, United States
|
|-
|Win
|align=center|1–0
|Aaron Lebrun
|Submission (rear-naked choke)
|Vengeance Fighting Alliance: Round 1
|
|align=center|1
|align=center|N/A
|Lake Charles, Louisiana, United States
|
|-

See also 
 List of current UFC fighters
 List of male mixed martial artists

References

External links 
  
 

1991 births
Living people
American male mixed martial artists
Light heavyweight mixed martial artists
Middleweight mixed martial artists
Mixed martial artists utilizing Brazilian jiu-jitsu
Mixed martial artists from Tennessee
Ultimate Fighting Championship male fighters
American practitioners of Brazilian jiu-jitsu
Sportspeople from Memphis, Tennessee